Rye Lane is a 2023 British romantic comedy-drama film directed by Raine Allen-Miller in her feature directorial debut from a screenplay by Nathan Bryon and Tom Melia. Set in the South London areas of Peckham and Brixton, the film is titled after the real-life Rye Lane.

Rye Lane had its world premiere at the 2023 Sundance Film Festival on 23 January 2023, was released in the United Kingdom on 17 March 2023, by Searchlight Pictures, and is scheduled to be released digitally in the United States on 31 March 2023, by Hulu.

Premise
Yas and Dom are two twenty-something South Londoners reeling from bad break-ups who connect over the course of an eventful day, helping each other deal with their nightmare exes, and potentially restoring their faith in romance.

Cast

Additionally, Colin Firth makes a cameo appearance in the film.

Production
Principal photography was underway in London as of April 2021, when it was revealed Nathan Bryon had written his first feature film script with Tom Melia, then under the working title Vibes & Stuff. Yvonne Isimeme Ibazebo of DJ Films and Damian Jones of Turnover Films produced the film, with assistance and funding from BBC Film, the British Film Institute (BFI), and Searchlight Pictures.

Jones had sent Raine Allen-Miller an invitation to direct the film as suggested by Eva Yates, BBC Film executive producer who had known Allen-Miller through her 2018 short film Jerk. After boarding the project, Allen-Miller helped to develop the script with Bryon, Melia, and script editor and executive producer Sophie Meyer. It was originally going to be set in Camden, North London. Other executive producers included Rose Garnett, Paul Grindey, Kristin Irving, and Charles Moore.

It was also revealed in April 2021 that Vivian Oparah and David Jonsson would star in the film.

Filming locations included the restaurant Coal Rooms, Rye Lane Market, the grocery store Nour Cash & Carry in Brixton Village, the chicken shop Morley's, the Italian restaurant Il Giardino, Brockwell Park, and Peckhamplex.

Release
Searchlight handled distribution. A trailer was released in January 2023. Rye Lane premiered at the 2023 Sundance Film Festival. This was followed by a red carpet UK premiere on 8 March 2023 at Peckhamplex and a theatrical release on 17 March. It will be released on the Disney+ Star platform internationally and on Hulu in the United States on 31 March 2023.

Reception
Rotten Tomatoes reported an approval rating of 98% based on 46 reviews, with an average rating of 8.3/10. The website's critics' consensus reads "Good news, rom-com fans: Anyone looking for a smart, funny, and heartwarming new addition to the canon can find it waiting on Rye Lane." "Not since Spike Lee introduced the world to Bed-Stuy, has a Black director so seamlessly embedded viewers into the verve and flavor of their neighborhood," wrote Robert Daniels for The Playlist. The Observer critic Mark Kermode described the film as a "hugely enjoyable romp that effortlessly combines the “limited time” romcom format of Richard Linklater’s Before trilogy with the in-your-face visual cheekiness of Peep Show".

References

External links
 

2020s British films
2023 films
2020s English-language films
2023 romantic comedy films
2023 drama films
BBC Film films
Black British cinema
Black British films
British Film Institute films
British romantic comedy-drama films
Brixton
2023 directorial debut films
Films shot in London
Films set in London
Peckham
Searchlight Pictures films
Hulu original films